The Bosnian War   ( / Рат у Босни и Херцеговини) was an international armed conflict that took place in Bosnia and Herzegovina between 1992 and 1995. The war is commonly seen as  having started on 6 April 1992, following a number of earlier violent incidents. The war ended on 14 December 1995 when the Dayton accords were signed. The main belligerents were the forces of the Republic of Bosnia and Herzegovina and those of Herzeg-Bosnia and Republika Srpska, proto-states led and supplied by Croatia and Serbia, respectively.

The war was part of the breakup of Yugoslavia. Following the Slovenian and Croatian secessions from the Socialist Federal Republic of Yugoslavia in 1991, the multi-ethnic Socialist Republic of Bosnia and Herzegovina – which was inhabited by mainly Muslim Bosniaks (44%), Orthodox Serbs (32.5%) and Catholic Croats (17%) – passed a referendum for independence on 29 February 1992. Political representatives of the Bosnian Serbs boycotted the referendum, and rejected its outcome. Anticipating the outcome of the referendum, the Assembly of the Serb People in Bosnia and Herzegovina adopted the Constitution of the Serbian Republic of Bosnia and Herzegovina on 28 February 1992. Following Bosnia and Herzegovina's declaration of independence (which gained international recognition) and following the withdrawal of Alija Izetbegović from the previously signed Cutileiro Plan (which proposed a division of Bosnia into ethnic cantons), the Bosnian Serbs, led by Radovan Karadžić and supported by the Serbian regime of Slobodan Milošević and the Yugoslav People's Army (JNA), mobilised their forces inside Bosnia and Herzegovina in order to secure ethnic Serb territory. Then war soon spread across the country, accompanied by ethnic cleansing.

The conflict was initially between Yugoslav Army units in Bosnia which later transformed into the Army of Republika Srpska (VRS) on the one side, and the Army of the Republic of Bosnia and Herzegovina (ARBiH), largely composed of Bosniaks, and the Croat forces in the Croatian Defence Council (HVO) on the other side. Tensions between Croats and Bosniaks increased throughout late 1992, resulting in the escalation of the Croat–Bosniak War in early 1993. The Bosnian War was characterised by bitter fighting, indiscriminate shelling of cities and towns, ethnic cleansing, and systematic mass rape, mainly perpetrated by Serb, and to a lesser extent, Croat and Bosniak forces. Events such as the siege of Sarajevo and the Srebrenica massacre later became iconic of the conflict.

The Serbs, although initially militarily superior due to the weapons and resources provided by the JNA, eventually lost momentum as the Bosniaks and Croats allied against the Republika Srpska in 1994 with the creation of the Federation of Bosnia and Herzegovina following the Washington agreement. Pakistan ignored the UN's ban on supply of arms, and airlifted anti tank missiles to the Bosnian Muslims, while after the Srebrenica and Markale massacres, NATO intervened in 1995 with Operation Deliberate Force targeting the positions of the Army of the Republika Srpska, which proved key in ending the war. The war ended after the signing of the General Framework Agreement for Peace in Bosnia and Herzegovina in Paris on 14 December 1995. Peace negotiations were held in Dayton, Ohio, and were finalised on 21 November 1995.

By early 2008, the International Criminal Tribunal for the former Yugoslavia convicted forty-five Serbs, twelve Croats, and four Bosniaks of war crimes in connection with the war in Bosnia. Estimates suggest around 100,000 people were killed during the war. Over 2.2 million people were displaced, making it, at the time, the most devastating conflict in Europe since the end of World War II. In addition, an estimated 12,000–50,000 women were raped, mainly carried out by Serb forces, with most of the victims being Bosniak women.

Chronology 
Clashes between Muslims, Croats, and Serbs in Bosnia started in late February 1992, and "full-scale hostilities had broken out by 6 April", the same day the United States and European Economic Community (EEC) recognised Bosnia and Herzegovina. Misha Glenny gives a date of 22 March, Tom Gallagher gives 2 April, while Mary Kaldor and Laura Silber and Allan Little give 6 April. Philip Hammond claimed the most common view is that the war started on April 6, 1992.

Serbs consider the Sarajevo wedding shooting, when a groom's father was killed on the second day of the Bosnian independence referendum, 1 March 1992, as the first death of the war. The Sijekovac killings of Serbs took place on 26 March and the Bijeljina massacre (of mostly Bosniaks) on 1–2 April. On 5 April, after protesters approached a barricade, a demonstrator was killed by Serb forces.

The war was brought to an end by the General Framework Agreement for Peace in Bosnia and Herzegovina, negotiated at Wright-Patterson Air Force Base in Dayton, Ohio between 1 and 21 November 1995 and signed in Paris on 14 December 1995.

Background

Breakup of Yugoslavia 

The war in Bosnia and Herzegovina came about as a result of the breakup of the Socialist Federal Republic of Yugoslavia. A crisis emerged in Yugoslavia as a result of the weakening of the confederational system at the end of the Cold War. In Yugoslavia, the national communist party, the League of Communists of Yugoslavia, lost ideological potency. Meanwhile, ethnic nationalism experienced a renaissance in the 1980s after violence in Kosovo. While the goal of Serbian nationalists was the centralisation of Yugoslavia, other nationalities in Yugoslavia aspired to the federalisation and the decentralisation of the state.

Bosnia and Herzegovina, a former Ottoman province, has historically been a multi-ethnic state. According to the 1991 census, 44% of the population considered themselves Muslim (Bosniak), 32.5% Serb and 17% Croat, with 6% describing themselves as Yugoslav.

March 1989, the crisis in Yugoslavia deepened after the adoption of amendments to the Serbian Constitution allowing the government of Serbia to dominate the provinces of Kosovo and Vojvodina. Until then, Kosovo and Vojvodina's decision-making was independent, and each autonomous province also had a vote at the Yugoslav federal level. Serbia, under newly elected President Slobodan Milošević, gained control over three out of eight votes in the Yugoslav presidency. With additional votes from Montenegro, Serbia was thus able to heavily influence the decisions of the federal government. This situation led to objections from the other republics and calls for the reform of the Yugoslav Federation.

At the 14th Extraordinary Congress of the League of Communists of Yugoslavia, on 20 January 1990, the delegations of the republics could not agree on the main issues facing the Yugoslav federation. As a result, the Slovene and Croatian delegates left the Congress. The Slovene delegation, headed by Milan Kučan, demanded democratic changes and a looser federation, while the Serbian delegation, headed by Milošević, opposed it.

In the first multi-party election in Bosnia and Herzegovina, in November 1990, votes were cast largely according to ethnicity, leading to the success of the Bosniak Party of Democratic Action (SDA), the Serb Democratic Party (SDS), and the Croatian Democratic Union (HDZ BiH).

Parties divided power along ethnic lines so the President of the Presidency of the Socialist Republic of Bosnia and Herzegovina was a Bosniak, the president of the Parliament was a Serb, and the prime minister a Croat. Separatist nationalist parties attained power in other republics, including Croatia and Slovenia.

Beginning of the Yugoslav Wars 

Meetings were held in early 1991 between the leaders of the six Yugoslav republics and the two autonomous regions to discuss the ongoing crisis in Yugoslavia. The Serbian leadership favoured a federal solution, whereas the Croatian and Slovenian leadership favoured an alliance of sovereign states. Bosnian leader Alija Izetbegović proposed an asymmetrical federation in February, where Slovenia and Croatia would maintain loose ties with the four remaining republics. Shortly after, he changed his position and opted for a sovereign Bosnia as a prerequisite for such a federation.

On 25 March, Franjo Tuđman and Serbian President Slobodan Milošević held a meeting in Karađorđevo. The meeting was controversial due to claims by some Yugoslav politicians the two presidents agreed to the partition of Bosnia and Herzegovina.

On 6 June, Izetbegović and Macedonian president Kiro Gligorov proposed a weak confederation between Croatia, Slovenia, and a federation of the other four republics. That was rejected by the Milošević administration.

On 25 June 1991, Slovenia and Croatia declared independence, leading to an armed conflict in Slovenia called the Ten-Day War, and the escalation of the Croatian War of Independence in areas with a substantial ethnic Serb population. In the second half of 1991, the war intensified in Croatia. The Yugoslav People's Army (JNA) also attacked Croatia from Bosnia and Herzegovina.

In July 1991, representatives of the Serb Democratic Party (SDS), including SDS president Radovan Karadžić, Muhamed Filipović, and Adil Zulfikarpašić from the Muslim Bosniak Organisation (MBO), drafted an agreement known as the Zulfikarpašić–Karadžić agreement. This would leave SR Bosnia and Herzegovina in a state union with SR Serbia and SR Montenegro. The agreement was denounced by Croat political parties. Although initially welcoming the initiative, the Izetbegović administration later dismissed the agreement.

Between September and November 1991, the SDS organised the creation of six "Serb Autonomous Regions" (SAOs). This was in response to the Bosniaks' steps toward seceding from Yugoslavia. Similar steps were taken by the Bosnian Croats.

In August 1991, the European Economic Community hosted a conference in an attempt to prevent Bosnia and Herzegovina from sliding into war.

On 25 September 1991, the United Nations Security Council passed Resolution 713, imposing an arms embargo on all former Yugoslav territories. The embargo had little effect on the JNA and Serb forces. By that time, the Croatian forces seized large amounts of weaponry from the JNA during the Battle of the Barracks. The embargo had a significant impact in Bosnia and Herzegovina at the start of the Bosnian War. The Serb forces inherited the armaments and the equipment of the JNA, while the Croat and Bosniak forces obtained arms through Croatia in violation of the embargo.

19 September 1991, the JNA moved extra troops to the area around the city of Mostar. This was protested by the local government. On 20 September 1991, the JNA transferred troops to the front at Vukovar via the Višegrad region of northeastern Bosnia. In response, local Croats and Bosniaks set up barricades and machine-gun posts. They halted a column of 60 JNA tanks, but were dispersed by force the following day. More than 1,000 people had to flee the area. This action, nearly seven months before the start of the Bosnian War, caused the first casualties of the Yugoslav Wars in Bosnia. In the first days of October, the JNA attacked and leveled the Croat village of Ravno in eastern Herzegovina, on their way to attack Dubrovnik in southern Croatia.

On 6 October 1991, Bosnian president Alija Izetbegović gave a televised proclamation of neutrality, it included the statement "it is not our war". In the meantime, Izetbegović made the following statement before the Bosnian parliament on 14 October with regard to the JNA: "Do not do anything against the Army. (...) the presence of the Army is a stabilizing factor to us, and we need that Army (...). Until now, we did not have problems with the Army, and we will not have problems later."

Throughout 1990, the RAM Plan was developed by SDB and a group of selected Serb officers of the Yugoslav People's Army (JNA) with the purpose of organizing Serbs outside Serbia, consolidating control of the fledgling SDS parties and the positioning of arms and ammunition.

The plan was meant to prepare the framework for a third Yugoslavia in which all Serbs with their territories would live together in the same state.

Journalist Giuseppe Zaccaria summarised a meeting of Serb army officers in Belgrade in 1992, reporting they had adopted an explicit policy to target women and children as the vulnerable portion of the Muslim religious and social structure. According to some sources, the RAM plan was crafted in the 1980s. Its existence was leaked by Ante Marković, the Prime Minister of Yugoslavia, an ethnic Croat from Bosnia and Herzegovina. The existence and possible implementation of it alarmed the Bosnian government.

Final political crisis 
On 15 October 1991, the parliament of the Socialist Republic of Bosnia and Herzegovina in Sarajevo passed a "Memorandum on the Sovereignty of Bosnia-Herzegovina" by a simple majority. The Memorandum was hotly contested by the Bosnian Serb members of parliament, arguing that Amendment LXX of the Constitution required procedural safeguards and a two-thirds majority for such issues. The Memorandum was debated anyway, leading to a boycott of the parliament by the Bosnian Serbs, and during the boycott the legislation was passed. The Serb political representatives proclaimed the Assembly of the Serb People of Bosnia and Herzegovina on 24 October 1991, declaring that the Serb people wished to remain in Yugoslavia. The Party of Democratic Action (SDA), led by Alija Izetbegović, was determined to pursue independence and was supported by Europe and the U.S. The SDS made it clear that if independence was declared, Serbs would secede as it was their right to exercise self-determination.

The HDZ BiH was established as a branch of the ruling party in Croatia, the Croatian Democratic Union (HDZ). While it called for the independence of the country, there was a split in the party with some members advocating secession of Croat-majority areas. In November 1991, the Croat leadership organised autonomous communities in areas with a Croat majority. On 12 November 1991, the Croatian Community of Bosnian Posavina was established in Bosanski Brod. It covered eight municipalities in northern Bosnia. On 18 November 1991, the Croatian Community of Herzeg-Bosnia was established in Mostar. Mate Boban was chosen as its president. Its founding document said: "The Community will respect the democratically elected government of the Republic of Bosnia and Herzegovina for as long as exists the state independence of Bosnia and Herzegovina in relation to the former, or any other, Yugoslavia".

Borisav Jović's memoirs show that on 5 December 1991 Milošević ordered the JNA troops in BiH to be reorganised and its non-Bosnian personnel to be withdrawn, in case recognition would result in the perception of the JNA as a foreign force; Bosnian Serbs would remain to form the nucleus of a Bosnian Serb army. Accordingly, by the end of the month only 10–15% of the personnel in the JNA in BiH was from outside the republic. Silber and Little note that Milošević secretly ordered all Bosnian-born JNA soldiers to be transferred to BiH. Jović's memoirs suggest that Milošević planned for an attack on Bosnia well in advance.

On 9 January 1992, the Bosnian Serbs proclaimed the "Republic of the Serbian People in Bosnia-Herzegovina" (SR BiH, later Republika Srpska), but did not officially declare independence. The Arbitration Commission of the Peace Conference on Yugoslavia in its 11 January 1992 Opinion No. 4 on Bosnia and Herzegovina stated that the independence of Bosnia and Herzegovina should not be recognised because the country had not yet held a referendum on independence.

On 25 January 1992, an hour after the session of parliament was adjourned, the parliament called for a referendum on independence on 29 February and 1 March. The debate had ended after Serb deputies withdrew after the majority Bosniak–Croat delegates turned down a motion that the referendum question be placed before the not yet established Council of National Equality. The referendum proposal was adopted in the form as proposed by Muslim deputies, in the absence of SDS members. As Burg and Shoup note, "the decision placed the Bosnian government and the Serbs on a collision course". The upcoming referendum caused international concern in February.

The Croatian War would result in United Nations Security Council Resolution 743 on 21 February 1992, which created the United Nations Protection Force (UNPROFOR).

During the talks in Lisbon on 21–22 February a peace plan was presented by EC mediator José Cutileiro, which proposed the independent state of Bosnia to be divided into three constituent units. Agreement was denounced by the Bosniak leadership on 25 February. On 28 February 1992, the Constitution of the SR BiH declared that the territory of that Republic included "the territories of the Serbian Autonomous Regions and Districts and of other Serbian ethnic entities in Bosnia and Herzegovina, including the regions in which the Serbian people remained in the minority due to the genocide conducted against it in World War II", and it was declared to be a part of Yugoslavia.

The Bosnian Serb assembly members advised Serbs to boycott the referendums held on 29 February and 1 March 1992. The turnout to the referendums was reported as 63.7%, with 92.7% of voters voting in favour of independence (implying that Bosnian Serbs, which made up approximately 34% of the population, largely boycotted the referendum). The Serb political leadership used the referendums as a pretext to set up roadblocks in protest. Independence was formally declared by the Bosnian parliament on 3 March 1992.

March 1992 unrest
During the referendum on 1 March, Sarajevo was quiet except for a shooting on a Serbian wedding. The brandishing of Serbian flags in the Baščaršija was seen by Muslims as a deliberate provocation on the day of the referendum. Nikola Gardović, the bridegroom's father, was killed, and a Serbian Orthodox priest was wounded. Witnesses identified the killer as Ramiz Delalić, also known as "Ćelo", a minor gangster who had become an increasingly brazen criminal since the fall of communism and was also stated to have been a member of the Bosniak paramilitary group "Green Berets". Arrest warrants were issued against him and another suspected assailant. SDS denounced the killing and claimed that the failure to arrest him was due to SDA or Bosnian government complicity. A SDS spokesman stated it was evidence that Serbs were in mortal danger and would be further so in an independent Bosnia, which was rejected by Sefer Halilović, founder of the Patriotic League, who stated that it was not a wedding but a provocation and accused the wedding guests of being SDS activists. Barricades appeared in the following early morning at key transit points across the city and were manned by armed and masked SDS supporters.

Following Bosnia and Herzegovina's declaration of independence from Yugoslavia on 3 March 1992, sporadic fighting broke out between Serbs and government forces all across the territory.

On 18 March 1992, all three sides signed the Lisbon Agreement: Alija Izetbegović for the Bosniaks, Radovan Karadžić for the Serbs and Mate Boban for the Croats. However, on 28 March 1992, Izetbegović, after meeting with the then-US ambassador to Yugoslavia Warren Zimmermann in Sarajevo, withdrew his signature and declared his opposition to any type of ethnic division of Bosnia.

In late March 1992, there was fighting between Serbs and combined Croat and Bosniak forces in and near Bosanski Brod, resulting in the killing of Serb villagers in Sijekovac. Serb paramilitaries committed the Bijeljina massacre, most of the victims of which were Bosniaks, on 1–2 April 1992.

Factions 
There were three factions in the Bosnian War:
Bosnian (mainly ethnically Bosniak), loyal to the Republic of Bosnia and Herzegovina
Croat, loyal to the Croatian Republic of Herzeg-Bosnia and Croatia
Serb (or Yugoslav), loyal to the Republika Srpska and FR Yugoslavia

The three ethnic groups predominantly supported their respective ethnic or national faction: Bosniaks mainly the ARBiH, Croats the HVO, Serbs the VRS. There were foreign volunteers in each faction.

Bosnian

The Bosnians mainly organised into the Army of the Republic of Bosnia and Herzegovina (ARBiH) as the armed forces of the Republic of Bosnia and Herzegovina. Forces of the Republic of Bosnia and Herzegovina were divided into five Corps. 1st Corps operated in the region of Sarajevo and Goražde, while the stronger 5th Corps was positioned in the western Bosanska Krajina pocket, which cooperated with HVO units in and around Bihać. The Bosnian government forces were poorly equipped and unprepared for war.

Sefer Halilović, Chief of Staff of the Bosnian Territorial Defense, claimed in June 1992 that his forces were 70% Muslim, 18% Croat and 12% Serb. The percentage of Serb and Croat soldiers in the Bosnian Army was particularly high in Sarajevo, Mostar and Tuzla. The deputy commander of the Bosnian Army's Headquarters, was general Jovan Divjak, the highest-ranking ethnic Serb in the Bosnian Army. General Stjepan Šiber, an ethnic Croat was the second deputy commander. Izetbegović also appointed colonel Blaž Kraljević, commander of the Croatian Defence Forces in Herzegovina, to be a member of Bosnian Army's Headquarters, seven days before Kraljević's assassination, in order to assemble a multi-ethnic pro-Bosnian defense front. This diversity was to reduce over the course of the war.

The Bosnian government lobbied to have the arms embargo lifted, but that was opposed by the United Kingdom, France and Russia. U.S. proposals to pursue this policy were known as lift and strike. The US congress passed two resolutions calling for the embargo to be lifted, but both were vetoed by President Bill Clinton for fear of creating a rift between the US and the aforementioned countries. Nonetheless, the United States used both "black" C-130 transports and back channels, including Islamist groups, to smuggle weapons to Bosnian-Muslim forces, as well as allowed Iranian-supplied arms to transit through Croatia to Bosnia. However, in light of widespread NATO opposition to American (and possibly Turkish) endeavors in coordinating the "black flights of Tuzla", the United Kingdom and Norway expressed disapproval of these measures and their counterproductive effects on NATO enforcement of the arms embargo.

Pakistan's Inter-Services Intelligence also played an active role during 1992–1995 and secretly supplied the Muslim fighters with arms, ammunition and guided anti tank missiles to give them a fighting chance against the Serbs. Pakistan was thus defying the UN ban on supplying arms to Bosnian Muslims, and General Javed Nasir later claimed that the ISI had airlifted anti-tank guided missiles to Bosnia, which ultimately turned the tide in favour of Bosnian Muslims and forced the Serbs to lift the siege.

In his book The Clinton Tapes: Wrestling History with the President from 2009, historian and author Taylor Branch, a friend of U.S. President Bill Clinton, made public more than 70 recorded sessions with the president during his presidency from 1993 through 2001. According to a session taped on 14 October 1993, it is stated that:

Croat
The Croats started organizing their military forces in late 1991. On 8 April 1992, the Croatian Defence Council (HVO) was founded as the "supreme body of Croatian defence in Herzeg-Bosnia". The HVO was organised in four Operative Zones with headquarters in Mostar, Tomislavgrad, Vitez and Orašje. In February 1993, the HVO Main Staff estimated the strength of the HVO at 34,080 officers and men. Its armaments included around 50 main battle tanks, mainly T-34 and T-55, and 500 various artillery weapons.

At the beginning of the war, the Croatian government helped arm both the Croat and Bosniak forces. Logistics centres were established in Zagreb and Rijeka for the recruitment of soldiers for the ARBiH. The Croatian National Guard (Zbor Narodne Garde, ZNG), later renamed officially to Croatian Army (HV) was engaged in Bosnian Posavina, Herzegovina and Western Bosnia against the Serb forces. During the Croat-Bosniak conflict, the Croatian government provided arms for the HVO and organised the sending of units of volunteers, with origins from Bosnia and Herzegovina, to the HVO.

The Croatian Defence Forces (HOS), the paramilitary wing of the Croatian Party of Rights, fought against the Serb forces together with the HVO and ARBiH. The HOS was disbanded shortly after the death of their commander Blaž Kraljević and incorporated into the HVO and ARBiH.

Serb
The Army of Republika Srpska (VRS) was established on 12 May 1992. It was loyal to Republika Srpska, the Serbian portion of Bosnia which did not wish to break away from FR Yugoslavia. Bosnian Serb political leader Radovan Karadžić stated "Our optimum is a Greater Serbia, and if not that, then a Federal Yugoslavia".

Serbia provided logistical support, money and supplies to the VRS. Bosnian Serbs had made up a substantial part of the JNA officer corps. Milošević relied on the Bosnian Serbs to win the war themselves. Most of the command chain, weaponry, and higher-ranked military personnel, including General Ratko Mladić, were from the JNA.

Paramilitary and volunteers

Various paramilitary units operated during the Bosnian War: the Serb "White Eagles" (Beli Orlovi) and "Serbian Volunteer Guard" (Srpska Dobrovoljačka Garda), also known as "Arkan's Tigers"; the Bosnian "Patriotic League" (Patriotska Liga) and "Green Berets" (Zelene Beretke); and Croat "Croatian Defence Forces" (Hrvatske Obrambene Snage), etc. The Serb and Croat paramilitaries involved volunteers from Serbia and Croatia, and were supported by nationalist political parties in those countries.

The war attracted foreign fighters and mercenaries from various countries. Volunteers came to fight for a variety of reasons, including religious or ethnic loyalties and in some cases for money. As a general rule, Bosniaks received support from Islamic countries, Serbs from Eastern Orthodox countries, and Croats from Catholic countries. The presence of foreign fighters is well documented, however none of these groups comprised more than 5 percent of any of the respective armies' total manpower strength.

The Bosnian Serbs received support from Christian Slavic fighters from various countries in Eastern Europe, including volunteers from other Orthodox Christian countries. These included hundreds of Russians, around 100 Greeks, and some Ukrainians and Romanians. Some estimate as many as 1,000 such volunteers. Greek volunteers of the Greek Volunteer Guard were reported to have taken part in the Srebrenica Massacre, with the Greek flag being hoisted in Srebrenica when the town fell to the Serbs.

Some individuals from other European countries volunteered to fight for the Croat side, including Neo-Nazis such as Jackie Arklöv, who was charged with war crimes upon his return to Sweden. Later he confessed he committed war crimes on Bosnian Muslim civilians in the Heliodrom and Dretelj camps as a member of Croatian forces.

The Bosnians received support from Muslim groups. Pakistan supported Bosnia while providing technical and military support. Pakistan's Inter-Services Intelligence (ISI) allegedly ran an active military intelligence program during the Bosnian War which started in 1992 lasting until 1995. Executed and supervised by Pakistani General Javed Nasir, the program provided logistics and ammunition supplies to various groups of Bosnian mujahideen during the war. The ISI Bosnian contingent was organised with financial assistance provided by Saudi Arabia, according to the British historian Mark Curtis.

According to The Washington Post, Saudi Arabia provided $300 million in weapons to government forces in Bosnia with the knowledge and tacit cooperation of the United States, a claim denied by US officials. Foreign Muslim fighters also joined the ranks of the Bosnian Muslims, including from the Lebanese guerrilla organisation Hezbollah, and the global organization al-Qaeda.

Prelude
During the war in Croatia, arms had been pouring into Bosnia. The JNA armed Bosnian Serbs, and the Croatian Defence Force armed Herzegovinian Croats. The Bosnian Muslim Green Berets and Patriotic League were already established in the autumn of 1991, and drew up a defense plan in February 1992. It was estimated that 250–300,000 Bosnians were armed, and that some 10,000 were fighting in Croatia. By March 1992, perhaps three-quarters of the country were claimed by Serb and Croat nationalists. On 4 April 1992, Izetbegović ordered all reservists and police in Sarajevo to mobilise, and SDS called for evacuation of the city's Serbs, marking the "definite rupture between the Bosnian government and Serbs". Bosnia and Herzegovina received international recognition on 6 April 1992. The most common view is that the war started that day.

Course of the war

1992 

The war in Bosnia escalated in April. On 3 April, the Battle of Kupres began between the JNA and a combined HV-HVO force that ended in a JNA victory. On 6 April Serb forces began shelling Sarajevo, and in the next two days crossed the Drina from Serbia proper and besieged Muslim-majority Zvornik, Višegrad and Foča. According to the International Criminal Tribunal for the former Yugoslavia, in 1992, after the capture of Zvornik, Bosnian Serb troops killed several hundred Muslims and forced tens of thousands to flee the area. All of Bosnia was engulfed in war by mid-April. On 23 April, the JNA evacuated its personnel by helicopter from the barracks in Čapljina, which had been blockaded since 4 March. There were some efforts to halt violence. On 27 April, the Bosnian government ordered the JNA to be put under civilian control or expelled, which was followed by a series of conflicts in early May between the two. Prijedor was taken over by Serbs on 30 April. On 2 May, the Green Berets and local gang members fought back a disorganised Serb attack aimed at cutting Sarajevo in two. On 3 May, Izetbegović was kidnapped at the Sarajevo airport by JNA officers, and used to gain safe passage of JNA troops from downtown Sarajevo. However, Bosnian forces attacked the departing JNA convoy, which embittered all sides. A cease-fire and agreement on evacuation of the JNA was signed on 18 May, and on 20 May the Bosnian presidency declared the JNA an occupation force.

The Army of Republika Srpska was newly established and put under the command of General Ratko Mladić, in a new phase of the war. Shellings on Sarajevo on 24, 26, 28 and 29 May were attributed to Mladić by UN Secretary-General Boutros Boutros-Ghali. Civilian casualties of a 27 May shelling of the city led to Western intervention, in the form of sanctions imposed on 30 May through United Nations Security Council Resolution 757. That same day Bosnian forces attacked the JNA barracks in the city, which was followed by heavy shelling. On 5 and 6 June the last JNA personnel left the city during heavy street fighting and shelling. The 20 June cease-fire, executed in order for UN takeover of the Sarajevo airport for humanitarian flights, was broken as both sides battled for control of the territory between the city and airport. The airport crisis led to Boutros-Ghali's ultimatum on 26 June, that the Serbs stop attacks on the city, allow the UN to take control of the airport, and place their heavy weapons under UN supervision. Meanwhile, media reported that Bush considered the use of force in Bosnia. World public opinion was "decisively and permanently against the Serbs" following media reports on the sniping and shelling of Sarajevo.

Outside of Sarajevo, the combatants' successes varied greatly in 1992. Serbs had seized Muslim-majority cities along the Drina and Sava rivers and expelled their Muslim population within months. A joint Bosnian–HVO offensive in May, having taken advantage of the confusion following JNA withdrawal, reversed Serb advances into Posavina and central Bosnia. The offensive continued southwards, besieging Doboj, thereby cutting off Serb forces in Bosanska Krajina from Semberija and Serbia. In mid-May, Srebrenica was retaken by Bosnian forces under Naser Orić. Serb forces suffered a costly defeat in eastern Bosnia in May, when according to Serbian accounts Avdo Palić's force was ambushed near Srebrenica, killing 400. From May to August, Goražde was besieged by the VRS, until the siege was broken by the ARBiH on 1 September. In April 1992, Croatian Defence Council (HVO) entered the town of Orašje and, according to Croatian sources, began a mass campaign of harassment against local Serb civilians, including torture, rape and murder.

On 15 May 1992, a JNA column was ambushed in Tuzla. 92nd Motorised JNA Brigade (stationed in "Husinska buna" barracks in Tuzla) received orders to leave the city of Tuzla and Bosnia-Herzegovina, and to enter Serbia. An agreement was made with the Bosnian government that JNA units would be allowed until 19 May to leave Bosnia peacefully. Despite the agreement, the convoy was attacked in Tuzla's Brčanska Malta district with rifles and rocket launchers; mines were also placed along its route. 52 JNA soldiers were killed and over 40 were wounded, most of them ethnic Serbs.

The Republic of Bosnia and Herzegovina was admitted as a member State of the United Nations on 22 May 1992.

From May to December 1992, the Bosnian Ministry of the Interior (BiH MUP), Croatian Defence Council (HVO) and later the Bosnian Territorial Defence Forces (TO RBiH) operated the Čelebići prison camp. It was used to detain 700 Bosnian Serb prisoners of war arrested during military operations that were intended to de-block routes to Sarajevo and Mostar in May 1992 which had earlier been blocked by Serb forces. Of these 700 prisoners, 13 died while in captivity. Detainees at the camp were subjected to torture, sexual assaults, beatings and otherwise cruel and inhuman treatment. Certain prisoners were shot and killed or beaten to death.

On 6 May 1992, Mate Boban met with Radovan Karadžić in Graz, Austria, where they reached an agreement for a ceasefire and discussed the details of the demarcation between a Croat and Serb territorial unit in Bosnia and Herzegovina. However, the ceasefire was broken on the following day when the JNA and Bosnian Serb forces mounted an attack on Croat-held positions in Mostar. In June 1992, Bosnian Serb forces attacked and pounded the small Bosnian village of Žepa, and would lead to the three-year long siege of Žepa.

By June 1992, the number of refugees and internally displaced persons had reached 2.6 million. By September 1992, Croatia had accepted 335,985 refugees from Bosnia and Herzegovina, mostly Bosniak civilians (excluding men of drafting age). The large number of refugees significantly strained the Croatian economy and infrastructure. Then-U.S. Ambassador to Croatia, Peter Galbraith, tried to put the number of Muslim refugees in Croatia into a proper perspective in an interview on 8 November 1993. He said the situation would be the equivalent of the United States taking in 30,000,000 refugees. The number of Bosnian refugees in Croatia was at the time surpassed only by the number of the internally displaced persons within Bosnia and Herzegovina itself, at 588,000. Serbia took in 252,130 refugees from Bosnia, while other former Yugoslav republics received a total of 148,657 people.

In June 1992, the Bosnian Serbs started Operation Corridor in northern Bosnia against HV–HVO forces, to secure an open road between Belgrade, Banja Luka, and Knin. The reported deaths of twelve newborn babies in Banja Luka hospital due to a shortage of bottled oxygen for incubators was cited as an immediate cause for the action, but the veracity of these deaths has since been questioned. Borisav Jović, a contemporary high-ranking Serbian official and member of the Yugoslav Presidency, has claimed that the report was just wartime propaganda, stating that Banja Luka had two bottled oxygen production plants in its immediate vicinity and was virtually self-reliant in that respect. Operation Corridor began on 14 June 1992, when the 16th Krajina Motorized Brigade of the VRS, aided by a VRS tank company from Doboj, began the offensive near Derventa. The VRS captured Modriča on 28 June, Derventa on 4–5 July, and Odžak on 12 July. The HV–HVO forces were reduced to isolated positions around Bosanski Brod and Orašje, which held out during August and September. The VRS managed to break through their lines in early October and capture Bosanski Brod. Most of the remaining Croat forces withdrew north to Croatia. The HV–HVO continued to hold the Orašje enclave and were able to repel an VRS attack in November.

On 21 June 1992, Bosniak forces entered the Bosnian Serb village of Ratkovići near Srebrenica and murdered 24 Serb civilians.

In June 1992, the UNPROFOR, originally deployed in Croatia, had its mandate extended into Bosnia and Herzegovina, initially to protect the Sarajevo International Airport. In September, the role of UNPROFOR was expanded to protect humanitarian aid and assist relief delivery in the whole Bosnia and Herzegovina, as well as to help protect civilian refugees when required by the Red Cross.

On 4 August 1992, the IV Knight Motorised Brigade of the ARBiH attempted to break through the circle surrounding Sarajevo, and a fierce battle ensued between the ARBiH and the VRS in and around the damaged FAMOS factory in the suburb of Hrasnica. The VRS repelled the attack, but failed to take Hrasnica in a decisive counterattack.

On 12 August 1992, the name of the Serbian Republic of Bosnia and Herzegovina was changed to Republika Srpska (RS). By November 1992,  of eastern Bosnia was under Muslim control.

Croat–Bosniak relations in late 1992 
The Croat–Bosniak alliance, formed at the beginning of the war, was often not harmonious. The existence of two parallel commands caused problems in coordinating the two armies against the VRS. An attempt to create a joint HVO and TO military headquarters in mid-April failed. On 21 July 1992, the Agreement on Friendship and Cooperation was signed by Tuđman and Izetbegović, establishing a military cooperation between the two armies. At a session held on 6 August, the Bosnian Presidency accepted HVO as an integral part of the Bosnian armed forces.

Despite these attempts, tensions steadily increased throughout the second half of 1992. An armed conflict occurred in Busovača in early May and another one on 13 June. On 19 June, a conflict between the units of the TO on one side, and HVO and HOS units on the other side broke out in Novi Travnik. Incidents were also recorded in Konjic in July, and in Kiseljak and the Croat settlement of Stup in Sarajevo during August. On 14 September, the Constitutional Court of Bosnia and Herzegovina declared the proclamation of Herzeg-Bosnia unconstitutional.

On 18 October, a dispute over a gas station near Novi Travnik that was shared by both armies escalated into armed conflict in the town center. The situation worsened after HVO Commander Ivica Stojak was killed near Travnik on 20 October. On the same day, fighting escalated on an ARBiH roadblock set on the main road through the Lašva Valley. Spontaneous clashes spread throughout the region and resulted in almost 50 casualties until a ceasefire was negotiated by the UNPROFOR on 21 October. On 23 October, a major battle between the ARBiH and the HVO started in the town of Prozor in northern Herzegovina and resulted in an HVO victory.

On 29 October, the VRS captured Jajce. The town was defended by both the HVO and the ARBiH, but the lack of cooperation, as well as an advantage in troop size and firepower for the VRS, led to the fall of the town. Croat refugees from Jajce fled to Herzegovina and Croatia, while around 20,000 Bosniak refugees settled in Travnik, Novi Travnik, Vitez, Busovača, and villages near Zenica. Despite the October confrontations, and with each side blaming the other for the fall of Jajce, there were no large-scale clashes and a general military alliance was still in effect. Tuđman and Izetbegović met in Zagreb on 1 November 1992 and agreed to establish a Joint Command of HVO and ARBiH.

1993 

On 7 January 1993, Orthodox Christmas Day, 8th Operational Unit Srebrenica, a unit of the ARBiH under the command of Naser Orić, attacked the village of Kravica near Bratunac. 46 Serbs died in the attack: 35 soldiers and 11 civilians.  119 Serb civilians and 424 Serb soldiers died in Bratunac during the war. Republika Srpska claimed that the ARBiH forces torched Serb homes and massacred civilians. However, this could not be independently verified during the ICTY trials, which concluded that many homes were already previously destroyed and that the siege of Srebrenica caused hunger, forcing Bosniaks to attack nearby Serb villages to acquire food and weapons to survive. In 2006, Orić was found guilty by the International Criminal Tribunal for the former Yugoslavia (ICTY) on the charges of not preventing murder of Serbs, but was subsequently acquitted of all charges on appeal.

On 8 January 1993, Serb forces killed the deputy prime minister of the RBiH Hakija Turajlić after stopping the UN convoy transporting him from the airport.

On 16 January 1993, soldiers of the ARBiH attacked the Bosnian Serb village of Skelani, near Srebrenica. 69 people were killed, 185 were wounded. Among the victims were 6 children.

A number of peace plans were proposed by the UN, the United States, and the European Community (EC), but they had little impact on the war. These included the Vance-Owen Peace Plan, revealed in January 1993. The plan was presented by the UN Special Envoy Cyrus Vance and EC representative David Owen. It envisioned Bosnia and Herzegovina as a decentralised state with ten autonomous provinces.

On 22 February 1993, the United Nations Security Council passed Resolution 808 that decided "that an international tribunal shall be established for the prosecution of persons responsible for serious violations of international humanitarian law". On 15–16 May, the Vance-Owen peace plan was rejected on a referendum.

The peace plan was viewed by some as one of the factors leading to the escalation of the Croat–Bosniak conflict in central Bosnia.

On 25 May 1993 the International Criminal Tribunal for the former Yugoslavia (ICTY) was formally established by Resolution 827 of the United Nations Security Council. On 31 March 1993, the United Nations Security Council issued Resolution 816, calling on member states to enforce a no-fly zone over Bosnia-Herzegovina. On 12 April 1993, NATO commenced Operation Deny Flight to enforce this no-fly zone.

In late July, representatives of Bosnia's three warring factions entered into a new round of negotiations. On 20 August, UN mediators Thorvald Stoltenberg and David Owen, showed a map that would set the stage for Bosnia to be partitioned into three ethnic states. Bosnian-Serbs would be given 52 percent of Bosnia's territory, Muslims would be given 30 percent and Bosnian-Croats would receive 18 percent. Alija Izetbegović rejected the plan on 29 August.

Outbreak of the Croat–Bosniak War 

Much of 1993 was dominated by the Croat–Bosniak War. In early January, the HVO and the ARBiH clashed in Gornji Vakuf in central Bosnia. A temporary ceasefire was reached after several days of fighting with UNPROFOR mediation. The war spread from Gornji Vakuf into the area of Busovača in the second half of January. Busovača was the main intersection point of the lines of communication in the Lašva Valley. By 26 January, the ARBiH seized control of several villages in the area, including Kaćuni and Bilalovac on the Busovača–Kiseljak road, thus isolating Kiseljak from Busovača. In the Kiseljak area, the ARBiH secured the villages northeast of the town of Kiseljak, but most of the municipality and the town itself remained in HVO control. On 26 January, six POWs and a Serb civilian were killed by the ARBiH in the village of Dusina, north of Busovača. The fighting in Busovača also led to a number of Bosniak civilian casualties.

On 30 January, ARBiH and HVO leaders met in Vitez, together with representatives from UNPROFOR and other foreign observers, and signed a ceasefire in the area of central Bosnia, which came into effect on the following day. The situation was still tense so Enver Hadžihasanović, commander of ARBiH's 3rd Corps, and Tihomir Blaškić, commander of HVO's Operative Zone Central Bosnia, had a meeting on 13 February where a joint ARBiH-HVO commission was formed to resolve incidents. The January ceasefire in central Bosnia held through the following two months and in the first weeks of April, despite numerous minor incidents. The Croats attributed the escalation of the conflict to the increased Islamic policy of the Bosniaks, while Bosniaks accused the Croat side of separatism.

Central Bosnia 
The beginning of April was marked by a series of minor incidents in central Bosnia between Bosniak and Croat civilians and soldiers, including assaults, murders and armed confrontations. The most serious incidents were the kidnapping of four members of the HVO outside Novi Travnik, and of HVO commander Živko Totić near Zenica by the mujahideen. The ARBiH representatives denied any involvement in these incidents and a joint ARBiH-HVO commission was formed to investigate them. The HVO personnel were subsequently exchanged in May for POWs that were arrested by the HVO. The April incidents escalated into an armed conflict on 15 April in the area of Vitez, Busovača, Kiseljak and Zenica. The outnumbered HVO in the Zenica municipality was quickly defeated, followed by a large exodus of Croat civilians.

In the Busovača municipality, the ARBiH gained some ground and inflicted heavy casualties on the HVO, but the HVO held the town of Busovača and the Kaonik intersection between Busovača and Vitez. The ARBiH failed to cut the HVO held Kiseljak enclave into several smaller parts and isolate the town of Fojnica from Kiseljak. Many Bosniak civilians were detained or forced to leave Kiseljak.

In the Vitez area, Blaškić used his limited forces to carry out spoiling attacks on the ARBiH, thus preventing the ARBiH from cutting of the Travnik–Busovača road and seizing the SPS explosives factory in Vitez. On 16 April, the HVO launched a spoiling attack on the village of Ahmići, east of Vitez. After the attacking units breached the ARBiH lines and entered the village, groups of irregular HVO units went from house to house, burning them and killing civilians. When Croat forces arrived in Ahmići, they left all Croats alone, and then massacred the Muslims in the village who couldn't flee in time. The massacre in Ahmići resulted in more than 100 killed Bosniak civilians. The massacre was discovered by United Nations Peacekeeping troops of the 1st Battalion, Cheshire Regiment, drawn from the British Army, under the command of Colonel Bob Stewart. The Bosnian Government made a monument dedicated to all 116 victims. Elsewhere in the area, the HVO blocked the ARBiH forces in the Stari Vitez quarter of Vitez and prevented an ARBiH advance south of the town. On 24 April, mujahideen forces attacked the village of Miletići northeast of Travnik and killed four Croat civilians. The rest of the captured civilians were taken to the Poljanice camp. However, the conflict did not spread to Travnik and Novi Travnik, although both the HVO and the ARBiH brought in reinforcements from this area. On 25 April, Izetbegović and Boban signed a ceasefire agreement. ARBiH Chief of Staff, Sefer Halilović, and HVO Chief of Staff, Milivoj Petković, met on a weekly basis to solve ongoing issues and implement the ceasefire. However, the truce was not respected on the ground and the HVO and ARBiH forces were still engaged in the Busovača area until 30 April.

Herzegovina 

The Croat–Bosniak War spread from central Bosnia to northern Herzegovina on 14 April with an ARBiH attack on a HVO-held village outside of Konjic. The HVO responded with capturing three villages northeast of Jablanica. On 16 April, 15 Croat civilians and 7 POWs were killed by the ARBiH in the village of Trusina, north of Jablanica. The battles of Konjic and Jablanica lasted until May, with the ARBiH taking full control of both towns and smaller nearby villages.

By mid-April, Mostar had become a divided city with the majority Croat western part dominated by the HVO, and the majority Bosniak eastern part dominated by the ARBiH. The Battle of Mostar began on 9 May when both the east and west parts of the city came under artillery fire. Fierce street battles followed that, despite a ceasefire signed on 13 May by Milivoj Petković and Sefer Halilović, continued until 21 May. The HVO established prison camps in Dretelj near Čapljina and in Heliodrom, while the ARBiH formed prison camps in Potoci and in a school in eastern Mostar. The battle was renewed on 30 June. The ARBiH secured the northern approaches to Mostar and the eastern part of the city, but their advance to the south was repelled by the HVO.

June–July Offensives 

In the first week of June, the ARBiH attacked the HVO headquarters in the town of Travnik and HVO units positioned on the front lines against the VRS. After three days of street fighting the outnumbered HVO forces were defeated, with thousands of Croat civilians and soldiers fleeing to nearby Serb-held territory as they were cut off from HVO held positions. The ARBiH offensive continued east of Travnik to secure the road to Zenica, which was achieved by 14 June. On 8 June, 24 Croat civilians and POWs were killed by the mujahideen near the village of Bikoši.

A similar development took place in Novi Travnik. On 9 June, the ARBiH attacked HVO units positioned east of the town, facing the VRS in Donji Vakuf, and the next day heavy fighting followed in Novi Travnik. By 15 June, the ARBiH secured the area northwest of the town, while the HVO kept the northeastern part of the municipality and the town of Novi Travnik. The battle continued into July with only minor changes on the front lines.

The HVO in the town of Kakanj was overran in mid June and around 13–15,000 Croat refugees fled to Kiseljak and Vareš. In the Kiseljak enclave, the HVO held off an attack on Kreševo, but lost Fojnica on 3 July. On 24 June, the Battle of Žepče began that ended with an ARBiH defeat on 30 June. In late July the ARBiH seized control of Bugojno, leading to the departure of 15,000 Croats. A prison camp was established in the town football stadium, where around 800 Croats were sent.

At the beginning of September, the ARBiH launched an operation known as Operation Neretva '93 against the HVO in Herzegovina and central Bosnia, on a 200 km long front. It was one of their largest offensives in 1993. The ARBiH expanded its territory west of Jablanica and secured the road to eastern Mostar, while the HVO kept the area of Prozor and secured its forces rear in western Mostar. During the night of 8/9 September, at least 13 Croat civilians were killed by the ARBiH in the Grabovica massacre. 29 Croat civilians and one POW were killed in the Uzdol massacre on 14 September.

On 23 October, 37 Bosniaks were killed by the HVO in the Stupni Do massacre. The massacre was used as an excuse for an ARBiH attack on the HVO-held Vareš enclave at the beginning of November. Croat civilians and soldiers abandoned Vareš on 3 November and fled to Kiseljak. The ARBiH entered Vareš on the following day, which was looted after its capture.

May–June 1993 UN Safe Areas extension 
In an attempt to protect civilians, the role of UNPROFOR was further extended in May 1993 to protect the "safe havens" that United Nations Security Council had declared around Sarajevo, Goražde, Srebrenica, Tuzla, Žepa and Bihać in Resolution 824 of 6 May 1993. On 4 June 1993 the UN Security Council passed Resolution 836 authorising the use of force by UNPROFOR in the protection of the safe zones. On 15 June 1993, Operation Sharp Guard, a naval blockade in the Adriatic Sea by NATO and the Western European Union, began and continued until it was lifted on 18 June 1996 on termination of the UN arms embargo.

The HVO and the ARBiH continued to fight side by side against the VRS in some areas of Bosnia and Herzegovina, including the Bihać pocket, Bosnian Posavina and the Tešanj area. Despite some animosity, an HVO brigade of around 1,500 soldiers also fought along with the ARBiH in Sarajevo. In other areas where the alliance collapsed, the VRS occasionally cooperated with both the HVO and ARBiH, pursuing a local balancing policy and allying with the weaker side.

1994 

The forced deportations of Bosniaks from Serb-held territories and the resulting refugee crisis continued to escalate. Thousands of people were being bused out of Bosnia each month, threatened on religious grounds. As a result, Croatia was strained by 500,000 refugees, and in mid-1994 the Croatian authorities forbade entry to a group of 462 refugees fleeing northern Bosnia, forcing UNPROFOR to improvise shelter for them. Between 30 March and 23 April 1994, the Serbs launched another major offensive against the town with the primary objective of overrunning Goražde. On 9 April 1994, the Secretary General of the UN, citing Security Resolution 836, threatened airstrikes on the Serbian forces which were attacking the Goražde enclave. For the next two days, NATO planes carried out air strikes against Serb tanks and outposts. However, these attacks did little to stop the overwhelming Bosnian Serb Army. The Bosnian Serb Army surrounded 150 UNPROFOR soldiers hostage in Goražde. Knowing Goražde would fall unless there was any foreign intervention, NATO issued the Serbs an ultimatum, and the Serbs were forced to comply. Under the conditions of the ultimatum, the Serbs had to withdraw all militias to 3 km from the town by 23 April 1994, and all of their artillery and armored vehicles  from the town by 26 April 1994. The VRS complied.

Markale massacre 

On 5 February 1994 Sarajevo suffered its deadliest single attack of the entire siege with the first Markale massacre, when a 120 millimeter mortar shell landed in the centre of the crowded marketplace, killing 68 people and wounding another 144. On 6 February, UN Secretary-General Boutros Boutros-Ghali formally requested NATO to confirm that future requests for air strikes would be carried out immediately.

On 9 February 1994, NATO authorised the Commander of Allied Forces Southern Europe (CINCSOUTH), US Admiral Jeremy Boorda, to launch air strikes—at the request of the UN—against artillery and mortar positions in or around Sarajevo determined by UNPROFOR to be responsible for attacks against civilian targets. Only Greece failed to support the use of air strikes, but did not veto the proposal.

NATO also issued an ultimatum to the Bosnian Serbs demanding the removal of heavy weapons around Sarajevo by midnight of 20–21 February, or they would face air strikes. On 12 February, Sarajevo enjoyed its first casualty free day since April 1992. The large-scale removal of Bosnian-Serb heavy weapons began on 17 February 1994.

Washington Agreement 

The Croat-Bosniak war ended with the signing of a ceasefire agreement between the HVO Chief of Staff, general Ante Roso, and the ARBiH Chief of Staff, general Rasim Delić, on 23 February 1994 in Zagreb. The agreement went into effect on 25 February. A peace agreement known as the Washington Agreement, mediated by the US, was concluded on 2 March by representatives of the Republic of Bosnia and Herzegovina, Croatia and Herzeg-Bosnia. The agreement was signed on 18 March 1994 in Washington. Under this agreement, the combined territory held by the HVO and the ARBiH was divided into autonomous cantons within the Federation of Bosnia and Herzegovina. Tuđman and Izetbegović also signed a preliminary agreement on a confederation between Croatia and the Federation of Bosnia and Herzegovina. The Croat-Bosniak alliance was renewed, although the issues dividing them were not resolved.

The first military effort coordinated between the HVO and the ARBiH following the Washington Agreement was the advance towards Kupres, which was retaken from the VRS on 3 November 1994. On 29 November, the HV and the HVO initiated Operation Winter '94 in southwestern Bosnia. The primary objective of relieving pressure on the Bihać pocket was not achieved, although the ARBiH repelled VRS attacks on the enclave.

UNPROFOR and NATO 

NATO became actively involved when its jets shot down four Serb aircraft over central Bosnia on 28 February 1994 for violating the UN no-fly zone. On 12 March 1994, the United Nations Protection Force (UNPROFOR) made its first request for NATO air support, but close air support was not deployed, owing to a number of delays associated with the approval process. On 20 March an aid convoy with medical supplies and doctors reached Maglaj, a city of 100,000 people, which had been under siege since May 1993 and had been surviving off food supplies dropped by US aircraft. A second convoy on 23 March was hijacked and looted.

On 10–11 April 1994, UNPROFOR called in air strikes to protect the Goražde safe area, resulting in the bombing of a Serbian military command outpost near Goražde by two US F-16 jets. This was the first time in NATO's history it had conducted air strikes. In retaliation, Serbs took 150 U.N. personnel hostage on 14 April. On 15 April the Bosnian government lines around Goražde broke, and on 16 April a British Sea Harrier was shot down over Goražde by Serb forces.

Around 29 April 1994, a Danish contingent (Nordbat 2) on peacekeeping duty in Bosnia, as part of UNPROFOR's Nordic battalion located in Tuzla, was ambushed when trying to relieve a Swedish observation post (Tango 2) that was under heavy artillery fire by the Bosnian Serb Šekovići brigade at the village of Kalesija. The ambush was dispersed when the UN forces retaliated with heavy fire in what would be known as Operation Bøllebank.

On 12 May, the US Senate adopted , introduced by Sen. Bob Dole, to unilaterally lift the arms embargo against the Bosnians, but it was repudiated by President Clinton. On 5 October 1994,  was signed by the President and stated that if the Bosnian Serbs had not accepted the Contact Group proposal by 15 October the President should introduce a UN Security Council proposal to end the arms embargo, and that if it was not passed by 15 November, only funds required by all UN members under Resolution 713 could be used to enforce the embargo, which would effectively end the embargo. On 12–13 November, the US unilaterally lifted the arms embargo against the government of Bosnia.

On 5 August, at the request of UNPROFOR, NATO aircraft attacked a target within the Sarajevo Exclusion Zone after weapons were seized by Bosnian Serbs from a weapons collection site near Sarajevo. On 22 September 1994, NATO aircraft carried out an air strike against a Bosnian Serb tank at the request of UNPROFOR. Operation Amanda was an UNPROFOR mission led by Danish peacekeeping troops, with the aim of recovering an observation post near Gradačac, Bosnia and Herzegovina, on 25 October 1994.

On 19 November 1994, the North Atlantic Council approved the extension of Close Air Support to Croatia for the protection of UN forces in that country. NATO aircraft attacked the Udbina airfield in Serb-held Croatia on 21 November, in response to attacks launched from that airfield against targets in the Bihac area of Bosnia and Herzegovina. On 23 November, after attacks launched from a surface-to-air missile site south of Otoka (north-west Bosnia and Herzegovina) on two NATO aircraft, air strikes were conducted against air defence radars in that area.

1995 

On 25 May 1995, NATO bombed VRS positions in Pale due to their failure to return heavy weapons. The VRS then shelled all safe areas, including Tuzla. Approximately 70 civilians were killed and 150 were injured. During April and June, Croatian forces conducted two offensives known as Leap 1 and Leap 2. With these offensives, they secured the remainder of the Livno Valley and threatened the VRS-held town of Bosansko Grahovo.

On 11 July 1995, Army of Republika Srpska (VRS) forces under general Ratko Mladić occupied the UN "safe area" of Srebrenica in eastern Bosnia where more than 8,000 men were killed in the Srebrenica massacre (most women were expelled to Bosniak-held territory). The United Nations Protection Force (UNPROFOR), represented on the ground by a 400-strong contingent of Dutch peacekeepers, Dutchbat, failed to prevent the town's capture by the VRS and the subsequent massacre. The ICTY ruled this event as genocide in the Krstić case. On 25 July 1995, Serbs launched "Operation Stupčanica 95" to occupy the second UN "safe area", Žepa. UNPROFOR only sent 79 Ukrainian peacekeepers to Žepa.

In line with the Split Agreement signed between Tuđman and Izetbegović on 22 July, a joint military offensive by the HV and the HVO codenamed Operation Summer '95 took place in western Bosnia. The HV-HVO force gained control of Glamoč and Bosansko Grahovo and isolated Knin from Republika Srpska. On 4 August, the HV launched Operation Storm that effectively dissolved the Republic of Serbian Krajina. With this, the Bosniak-Croat alliance gained the initiative in the war, taking much of western Bosnia from the VRS in several operations in September and October. In Novi Grad, Croatian forces launched Operation Una, which began on 18 September 1995, when HV crossed the Una river and entered Bosnia. In 2006, Croatian authorities began investigating allegations of war crimes committed during this operation, specifically the killing of 40 civilians in the Bosanska Dubica area by troops of the 1st Battalion of the 2nd Guards Brigade.

At the same time, the ARBiH engaged the VRS further to the north in Operation Sana and captured several towns, including Bosanska Krupa, Bosanski Petrovac, Ključ and Sanski Most. A VRS counteroffensive against the ARBiH in western Bosnia was launched on 23/24 September. Within two weeks the VRS was in the vicinity of the town of Ključ. The ARBiH requested Croatian assistance and on 8 October the HV-HVO launched Operation Southern Move under the overall command of HV Major General Ante Gotovina.

On 28 August, a VRS mortar attack on the Sarajevo Markale marketplace killed 43 people. In response to the second Markale massacre, on 30 August, the Secretary General of NATO announced the start of Operation Deliberate Force, widespread airstrikes against Bosnian Serb positions supported by UNPROFOR rapid reaction force artillery attacks. On 14 September 1995, the NATO air strikes were suspended to allow the implementation of an agreement with Bosnian Serbs for the withdrawal of heavy weapons from around Sarajevo. Twelve days later, on 26 September, an agreement of further basic principles for a peace accord was reached in New York City between the foreign ministers of Bosnia and Herzegovina, Croatia and the FRY. A 60-day ceasefire came into effect on 12 October, and on 1 November peace talks began in Dayton, Ohio. The war ended with the Dayton Peace Agreement signed on 21 November 1995; the final version of the peace agreement was signed 14 December 1995 in Paris.

Following the Dayton Agreement, a NATO led Implementation Force (IFOR) was deployed to Bosnia-Herzegovina. This 80,000 strong unit, was deployed in order to enforce the peace, as well as other tasks such as providing support for humanitarian and political aid, reconstruction, providing support for displaced civilians to return to their homes, collection of arms, and mine and unexploded ordnance clearing of the affected areas.

Casualties 

Calculating the number of deaths resulting from the conflict has been subject to considerable, highly politicised debate, sometimes "fused with narratives about victimhood", from the political elites of various groups. Estimates of the total number of casualties have ranged from 25,000 to 329,000. The variations are partly the result of the use of inconsistent definitions of who can be considered victims of the war, as some research calculated only direct casualties of military activity while other research included those who died from hunger, cold, disease or other war conditions. Early overcounts were also the result of many victims being entered in both civilian and military lists because little systematic coordination of those lists took place in wartime conditions. The death toll was originally estimated in 1994 at around 200,000 by Cherif Bassiouni, head of the UN expert commission investigating war crimes.

Prof. Steven L. Burg and Prof. Paul S. Shoup, writing in 1999, observed about early high figures:

RDC figures 

In June 2007, the Sarajevo-based Research and Documentation Center published extensive research on the Bosnian war deaths, also called The Bosnian Book of the Dead, a database that initially revealed a minimum of 97,207 names of Bosnia and Herzegovina's citizens confirmed as killed or missing during the 1992–1995 war. The head of the UN war crimes tribunal's Demographic Unit, Ewa Tabeau, has called it "the largest existing database on Bosnian war victims", and it is considered the most authoritative account of human losses in the Bosnian war. More than 240,000 pieces of data were collected, checked, compared and evaluated by an international team of experts in order to produce the 2007 list of 97,207 victims' names.

The RDC 2007 figures stated that these were confirmed figures and that several thousand cases were still being examined. All of the RDC figures are believed to be a slight undercount as their methodology is dependent on a family member having survived to report the missing relative, though the undercount is not thought to be statistically significant. At least 30 percent of the 2007 confirmed Bosniak civilian victims were women and children.

The RDC published periodic updates of its figures until June 2012, when it published its final report. The 2012 figures recorded a total of 101,040 dead or disappeared, of whom 61.4 percent were Bosniaks, 24.7 percent were Serbs, 8.3 percent were Croats and less than 1 percent were of other ethnicities, with a further 5 percent whose ethnicity was unstated.

Civilian deaths were established as 38,239, which represented 37.9 percent of total deaths. Bosniaks accounted for 81.3 percent of those civilian deaths, compared to Serbs 10.9 percent and Croats 6.5 percent. The proportion of civilian victims is, moreover, an absolute minimum because the status of 5,100 victims was unestablished and because relatives had registered their dead loved ones as military victims in order to obtain veteran's financial benefits or for "honour" reasons.

Both the RDC and the ICTY's demographic unit applied statistical techniques to identify possible duplication caused by a given victim being recorded in multiple primary lists, the original documents being then hand-checked to assess duplication.

Some 30 categories of information existed within the database for each individual record, including basic personal information, place and date of death, and, in the case of soldiers, the military unit to which the individual belonged. This has allowed the database to present deaths by gender, military unit, year and region of death, in addition to ethnicity and "status in war" (civilian or soldier). The category intended to describe which military formation caused the death of each victim was the most incomplete and was deemed unusable.

ICTY figures 

Research conducted in 2010 for the Office of the Prosecutors at the Hague Tribunal, headed by Ewa Tabeau, pointed to errors in earlier figures and calculated the minimum number of victims as 89,186, with a probable figure of around 104,732. Tabeau noted the numbers should not be confused with "who killed who", because, for example, many Serbs were killed by the Serb army during the shelling of Sarajevo, Tuzla and other multi-ethnic cities. The authors of this report said that the actual death toll may be slightly higher.

These figures were not based solely on "battle deaths", but included accidental deaths taking place in battle conditions and acts of mass violence. Specifically excluded were "non-violent mortality increases" and "criminal and unorganised violence increases". Similarly "military deaths" included both combat and non-combat deaths.

Other statistics 
There are no statistics dealing specifically with the casualties of the Croat-Bosniak conflict along ethnic lines. However, according to The RDC's data on human losses in the regions, in Central Bosnia 62 percent of the 10,448 documented deaths were Bosniaks, while Croats constituted 24 percent and Serbs 13 percent. The municipalities of Gornji Vakuf and Bugojno are geographically located in Central Bosnia (known as Gornje Povrbasje region), but the 1,337 region's documented deaths are included in Vrbas regional statistics. Approximately 70–80 percent of the casualties from Gornje Povrbasje were Bosniaks. In the region of Neretva river, of 6,717 casualties, 54 percent were Bosniaks, 24 percent Serbs and 21 percent Croats. The casualties in those regions were mainly, but not exclusively, the consequence of Croat-Bosniak conflict.

According to the UN, there were 167 fatalities amongst UNPROFOR personnel during the course of the force's mandate, from February 1992 to March 1995. Of those who died, three were military observers, 159 were other military personnel, one was a member of the civilian police, two were international civilian staff and two were local staff.

In a statement in September 2008 to the United Nations General Assembly, Haris Silajdžić said that "According to the ICRC data, 200,000 people were killed, 12,000 of them children, up to 50,000 women were raped, and 2.2 million were forced to flee their homes. This was a veritable genocide and sociocide". However, Silajdžić and others have been criticised for inflating the number of fatalities to attract international support. An ICRC book published in 2010 cites the total number killed in all of the Balkan Wars in the 1990s as "about 140,000 people".

Many of the 34,700 people who were reported missing during the Bosnian war remain unaccounted for. In 2012 Amnesty reported that the fate of an estimated 10,500 people, most of whom were Bosnian Muslims, remained unknown. Bodies of victims are still being unearthed two decades later. In July 2014 the remains of 284 victims, unearthed from the Tomašica mass grave near the town of Prijedor, were laid to rest in a mass ceremony in the northwestern town of Kozarac, attended by relatives.

The UNCHR stated that the conflict in Bosnia and Herzegovina forced more than 2.2 million people to flee their homes, making it the largest displacement of people in Europe since the end of World War II.

War crimes 

According to a report compiled by the UN, and chaired by M. Cherif Bassiouni, while all sides committed war crimes during the conflict, Serbian forces were responsible for ninety percent of them, whereas Croatian forces were responsible for six percent, and Bosniak forces four percent. The report echoed conclusions published by a Central Intelligence Agency estimate in 1995. In October 2019, a third of the war crime charges filed by the Bosnian state prosecution during the year were transferred to lower-level courts, which sparked criticism of prosecutors.

Ethnic cleansing 

Ethnic cleansing was a common phenomenon in the war. Large numbers of Bosnian Muslims (Bosniaks) and Bosnian Croats were forced to flee their homes or were expelled by the Army of Republika Srpska and Serb paramilitaries. This entailed intimidation, forced expulsion, or killing of the unwanted ethnic group as well as the destruction of the places of worship, cemeteries and cultural and historical buildings of that ethnic group. Due to this, tens of thousands were killed, Between one and 1.3 million deported or forcibly resettled, and 12,000 to 20,000 women raped. Academics Matjaž Klemenčič and Mitja Žagar argue that: "Ideas of nationalistic ethnic politicians that Bosnia and Herzegovina be reorganised into homogenous national territories inevitably required the division of ethnically mixed territories into their Serb, Croat, and Muslim parts".
According to numerous ICTY verdicts and indictments, Serb and Croat forces performed ethnic cleansing of their territories to create ethnically pure states (Republika Srpska and Herzeg-Bosnia). Serb forces carried out the Srebrenica genocide towards the end of the war. The Central Intelligence Agency claimed, in a 1995 report, that Bosnian Serb forces were responsible for 90 percent of the ethnic cleansing committed during the conflict.

Based on the evidence of numerous HVO attacks, the ICTY Trial Chamber concluded in the Kordić and Čerkez case that by April 1993 Croat leadership had a common design or plan conceived and executed to ethnically cleanse Bosniaks from the Lašva Valley in Central Bosnia. Dario Kordić, as the local political leader, was found to be the planner and instigator of this plan.

Although comparatively rare, there were also cases of Bosniak forces forcing other ethnic groups to flee during the war. There were also sporadic instances of Bosniaks and Croats committing atrocities against ethnic Serbs.

Genocide 

A trial took place before the International Court of Justice, following a 1993 suit by Bosnia and Herzegovina against Serbia and Montenegro alleging genocide. The ICJ ruling of 26 February 2007 indirectly determined the war's nature to be international, though clearing Serbia of direct responsibility for the genocide committed by the forces of Republika Srpska. The ICJ concluded, however, that Serbia failed to prevent genocide committed by Serb forces and failed to punish those responsible, and bring them to justice. A telegram sent to the White House on 8 February 1994 and penned by U.S. Ambassador to Croatia, Peter W. Galbraith, stated that genocide was occurring. The telegram cited "constant and indiscriminate shelling and gunfire" of Sarajevo by Karadzic's Yugoslav People Army; the harassment of minority groups in Northern Bosnia "in an attempt to force them to leave"; and the use of detainees "to do dangerous work on the front lines" as evidence that genocide was being committed. In 2005, the United States Congress passed a resolution declaring that "the Serbian policies of aggression and ethnic cleansing meet the terms defining genocide".

Despite the evidence of many kinds of war crimes conducted simultaneously by different Serb forces in different parts of Bosnia and Herzegovina, especially in Bijeljina, Sarajevo, Prijedor, Zvornik, Banja Luka, Višegrad and Foča, the judges ruled that the criteria for genocide with the specific intent (dolus specialis) to destroy Bosnian Muslims were met only in Srebrenica or Eastern Bosnia in 1995.

The court concluded the crimes committed during the 1992–1995 war, may amount to crimes against humanity according to the international law, but that these acts did not, in themselves, constitute genocide per se. The Court further decided that, following Montenegro's declaration of independence in May 2006, Serbia was the only respondent party in the case, but that "any responsibility for past events involved at the relevant time the composite State of Serbia and Montenegro".

Rape 
 
An estimated 12,000–50,000 women were raped, most of them Bosnian Muslims with the majority of cases committed by Serb forces. This has been referred to as "Mass rape", particularly with regard to the coordinated use of rape as a weapon of war by members in the VRS and Bosnian Serb police. For the first time in judicial history, the International Criminal Tribunal for the former Yugoslavia (ICTY) declared that "systematic rape", and "sexual enslavement" in time of war was a crime against humanity, second only to the war crime of genocide. Rape was most systematic in Eastern Bosnia (e.g. during campaigns in Foča and Višegrad), and in Grbavica during the siege of Sarajevo. Women and girls were kept in various detention centres where they had to live in intolerably unhygienic conditions and were mistreated in many ways including being repeatedly raped. A notorious example was "Karaman's house" in Foča. Common complications among surviving women and girls include psychological, gynaecological and other physical disorders, as well as unwanted pregnancies and sexually transmitted diseases.

Prosecutions and legal proceedings 

The International Criminal Tribunal for the former Yugoslavia (ICTY) was established in 1993 as a body of the UN to prosecute war crimes committed during the wars in the former Yugoslavia, and to try their perpetrators. The tribunal is an ad hoc court which is located in The Hague, the Netherlands.

According to legal experts, as of early 2008, 45 Serbs, 12 Croats and 4 Bosniaks were convicted of war crimes by the ICTY in connection with the Balkan wars of the 1990s. Both Serbs and Croats were indicted and convicted of systematic war crimes (joint criminal enterprise), while Bosniaks were indicted and convicted of individual ones. Most of the Bosnian Serb wartime leadership – Biljana Plavšić, Momčilo Krajišnik, Radoslav Brđanin, and Duško Tadić – were indicted and judged guilty for war crimes and ethnic cleansing.

The former president of Republika Srpska Radovan Karadžić was held on trial and was sentenced to life in prison for crimes, including crimes against humanity and genocide. Ratko Mladić was also tried by the ICTY, charged with crimes in connection with the siege of Sarajevo and the Srebrenica massacre. Mladić was found guilty and also sentenced to life imprisonment by The Hague in November 2017. Paramilitary leader Vojislav Šešelj was on trial from 2007 to 2018, accused of being a part of a joint criminal enterprise to ethnically cleanse large areas of Bosnia-Herzegovina of non-Serbs. The Serbian president Slobodan Milošević was charged with war crimes in connection with the war in Bosnia, including grave breaches of the Geneva Conventions, crimes against humanity and genocide, but died in 2006 before the trial could finish.

After the death of Alija Izetbegović, The Hague revealed that an ICTY investigation of Izetbegović had been in progress which ended with his death. Bosniaks who were convicted of or were tried for war crimes include Rasim Delić, chief of staff of the Army of Bosnia and Herzegovina, who was sentenced to three years' imprisonment on 15 September 2008 for his failure to prevent the Bosnian mujahideen members of the Bosnian army from committing crimes against captured civilians and enemy combatants. Enver Hadžihasanović, a general of the Army of the Republic of Bosnia and Herzegovina, was sentenced to 3.5 years for authority over acts of murder and wanton destruction in Central Bosnia. Hazim Delić was the Bosniak Deputy Commander of the Čelebići prison camp, which detained Serb civilians. He was sentenced to 18 years by the ICTY Appeals Chamber on 8 April 2003 for murder and torture of the prisoners and for raping two Serbian women. Bosnian commander Sefer Halilović was charged with one count of violation of the laws and customs of war on the basis of superior criminal responsibility of the incidents during Operation Neretva '93 and found not guilty. Serbs have accused Sarajevo authorities of practicing selective justice by actively prosecuting Serbs while ignoring or downplaying Bosniak war crimes.

Dario Kordić, political leader of Croats in Central Bosnia, was convicted of the crimes against humanity in Central Bosnia i.e. ethnic cleansing and sentenced to 25 years in prison. On 29 May 2013, in a first instance verdict, the ICTY sentenced Prlić to 25 years in prison. The tribunal also convicted five other war time leaders of the joint trial: defence minister of Herzeg-Bosnia Bruno Stojić (20 years), military officers Slobodan Praljak (20 years) and Milivoj Petković (20 years), military police commander Valentin Ćorić (20 years), and head of prisoner exchanges and detention facilities Berislav Pušić (10 years). The Chamber ruled, by majority, with the presiding judge Jean-Claude Antonetti dissenting, that they took part in a joint criminal enterprise (JCE) against the non-Croat population of Bosnia and Herzegovina and that the JCE included the Croatian President Franjo Tuđman, Defence Minister Gojko Šušak, and general Janko Bobetko. However, on 19 July 2016 the Appeals Chamber in the case announced that the "Trial Chamber made no explicit findings concerning [Tudjman's, Šušak's and Bobetko's] participation in the JCE and did not find [them] guilty of any crimes."

Genocide at Srebrenica is the most serious war crime that any Serbs were convicted of. Crimes against humanity is the most serious war crime that any Bosniaks or Croats were convicted of.

Reconciliation 

On 6 December 2004, Serbian president Boris Tadić made an apology in Bosnia and Herzegovina to all those who suffered crimes committed in the name of the Serb people.

Croatia's president Ivo Josipović apologised in April 2010 for his country's role in the Bosnian War. Bosnia and Herzegovina's then-president Haris Silajdžić in turn praised relations with Croatia, remarks that starkly contrasted with his harsh criticism of Serbia the day before. "I'm deeply sorry that the Republic of Croatia has contributed to the suffering of people and divisions which still burden us today", Josipović told Bosnia and Herzegovina's parliament.

On 31 March 2010, the Serbian parliament adopted a declaration "condemning in strongest terms the crime committed in July 1995 against Bosniak population of Srebrenica" and apologizing to the families of the victims, the first of its kind in the region. The initiative to pass a resolution came from President Boris Tadić, who pushed for it even though the issue was politically controversial. In the past, only human rights groups and non-nationalistic parties had supported such a measure.

Assessment

Civil war or a war of aggression 
Due to the involvement of Croatia and Serbia, there has been a long-standing debate as to whether the conflict was a civil war or a war of aggression on Bosnia by neighbouring states. Academics Steven Burg and Paul Shoup argue that:

On the one hand, the war could be viewed as "a clear-cut case of civil war – that is, of internal war among groups unable to agree on arrangements for sharing power".

David Campbell is critical of narratives about "civil war", which he argues often involve what he terms "moral levelling", in which all sides are "said to be equally guilty of atrocities", and "emphasise credible Serb fears as a rationale for their actions".

Bosnian Serbs and Bosnian Croats enjoyed substantial political and military backing from Serbia and Croatia, and the decision to grant Bosnia diplomatic recognition also had implications for the international interpretation of the conflict. As Burg and Shoup state:

Sumantra Bose, meanwhile, argues that it is possible to characterise the Bosnian War as a civil war, without necessarily agreeing with the narrative of Serb and Croat nationalists. He states that while "all episodes of severe violence have been sparked by 'external' events and forces, local society too has been deeply implicated in that violence" and therefore argues that "it makes relatively more sense to regard the 1992–95 conflict in Bosnia as a 'civil war' – albeit obviously with a vital dimension that is territorially external to Bosnia".

In the cases involving Duško Tadić and Zdravko Mucić, the ICTY concluded that the conflict between Bosnia and Herzegovina and Federal Republic of Yugoslavia was an international one:

Similarly, in the cases involving Ivica Rajić, Tihomir Blaškić and Dario Kordić, the ICTY concluded that the conflict between Bosnia and Herzegovina and Croatia was also an international one:

In 2010, Bosnian Commander Ejup Ganić was detained in London on a Serbian extradition request for alleged war crimes. Judge Timothy Workman decided that Ganić should be released after ruling that Serbia's request was "politically motivated". In his decision, he characterised the Bosnian War to have been an international armed conflict as Bosnia had declared independence on 3 March 1992.

Academic Mary Kaldor argues that the Bosnian War is an example of what she terms new wars, which are neither civil nor inter-state, but rather combine elements of both.

Ethnic war
In The Myth of Ethnic War: Serbia and Croatia in the 1990s, Ithaca College Professor V.P. Gagnon challenges the widely accepted belief in the West that the Bosnian War (and the other Yugoslav wars) were a product of ethnic hatred between the warring factions. Gagnon argues that the wars were caused by power-hungry political elites who resisted political and economical liberalization and democratization, not ordinary people. In disputing the common assessment by Western academics, politicians and journalists of an ethnic war and of the Balkans as a region antithetical to Western values, Gagnon cites high intermarriage rates, the high percentage of draft-resisters, resistance to nationalist movements and favourable views of inter-ethnic relations in polling conducted in the late 1980s in Yugoslavia among other factors.

In popular culture

Film 
The Bosnian War has been depicted in a number of films including Hollywood films such as The Hunting Party, starring Richard Gere as journalist Simon Hunt in his bid to apprehend suspected war criminal and former Bosnian Serb president Radovan Karadžić; Behind Enemy Lines, loosely based on the Mrkonjić Grad incident, tells about a downed US Navy pilot who uncovers a massacre while on the run from Serb troops who want him dead; The Peacemaker, starring George Clooney and Nicole Kidman, is a story about a US Army colonel and a White House nuclear expert investigating stolen Russian nuclear weapons obtained by a revenge-fueled Yugoslav diplomat, Dušan Gavrić.

In the Land of Blood and Honey, is a 2011 American film written, produced and directed by Angelina Jolie; the film was Jolie's directorial debut and it depicts a love story set against the mass rape of Muslim women in the Bosnian War. The Spanish/Italian 2013 film Twice Born, starring Penélope Cruz, based on a book by Margaret Mazzantini. It tells the story of a mother who brings her teenage son to Sarajevo, where his father died in the Bosnian conflict years ago.

British films include Welcome to Sarajevo, about the life of Sarajevans during the siege. The Bosnian-British film Beautiful People directed by Jasmin Dizdar portrays the encounter between English families and arriving Bosnian refugees at the height of the Bosnian War. The film was awarded the Un Certain Regard at the 1999 Cannes Festival. The Spanish film Territorio Comanche shows the story of a Spanish TV crew during the siege of Sarajevo. The Polish film Demons of War (1998), set during the Bosnian conflict, portrays a group of Polish soldiers in IFOR who help a pair of journalists tracked by a local warlord whose crimes they had taped.

Bosnian director Danis Tanović's No Man's Land won the Best Foreign Language Film awards at the 2001 Academy Awards and the 2002 Golden Globes. The Bosnian film Grbavica, about the life of a single mother in contemporary Sarajevo in the aftermath of systematic rape of Bosniak women by Serbian troops during the war, won the Golden Bear at the Berlin International Film Festival.

The 2003 film Remake, directed by Bosnian director Dino Mustafić and written by Zlatko Topčić, follows father Ahmed and son Tarik Karaga during World War II and the Siege of Sarajevo. It premiered at the 32nd International Film Festival Rotterdam. The 2010 film The Abandoned, directed by Adis Bakrač and written by Zlatko Topčić, tells the story of a boy from a home for abandoned children who tries to find the truth about his origins, it being implied that he is the child of a rape. The film premiered at the 45th Karlovy Vary International Film Festival.

The 1997 film The Perfect Circle, directed by Bosnian filmmaker Ademir Kenović, tells the story of two boys during the Siege of Sarajevo and was awarded with the François Chalais Prize at the 1997 Cannes Festival.

The 1998 film Savior, starring Dennis Quaid tells the story of a hardened mercenary in the Foreign Legion who begins to find his own humanity when confronted with atrocities during the fighting in Bosnia.

Pretty Village, Pretty Flame directed by Serbian filmmaker Srđan Dragojević, presents a bleak yet darkly humorous account of the Bosnian War. The Serbian film Life Is a Miracle, produced by Emir Kusturica, depicts the romance of a pacific Serb station caretaker and a Muslim Bosniak young woman entrusted to him as a hostage in the context of Bosniak-Serb border clashes; it was nominated at the 2004 Cannes Festival.

Short films such as In the Name of the Son, about a father who murders his son during the Bosnian War, and 10 Minutes, which contrasts 10 minutes of life of a Japanese tourist in Rome with a Bosnian family during the war. The film was awarded Best short film of 2002 by the European Film Academy.

A number of Western films made the Bosnian conflict the background of their stories – some of those include Avenger, based on Frederick Forsyth's novel in which a mercenary tracks down a Serbian warlord responsible for war crimes, and The Peacemaker, in which a Yugoslav man emotionally devastated by the losses of war plots to take revenge on the United Nations by exploding a nuclear bomb in New York. The Whistleblower tells the true story of Kathryn Bolkovac, a UN peacekeeper that uncovered a human-trafficking scandal involving the United Nations in post-war Bosnia. Shot Through the Heart is a 1998 TV film, directed by David Attwood, shown on BBC and HBO in 1998, which covers the Siege of Sarajevo during the Bosnian War from the perspective of two Olympic-level Yugoslavian marksmen, one whom becomes a sniper.

Quo Vadis, Aida? is a 2020 Bosnian film, written and directed by Jasmila Žbanić, about Aida, a UN translator who tries to save her family after the Army of Republika Srpska takes over the city of Srebrenica immediately prior to the Srebrenica massacre.

Drama series 
The award-winning British television series, Warriors, aired on BBC One in 1999. It tells the story of a group of British peacekeepers during the Lašva Valley ethnic cleansing. Many of the war's events were depicted in the Pakistani drama series, Alpha Bravo Charlie, written and directed by Shoaib Mansoor in 1998. Produced by the Inter-Services Public Relations (ISPR), the series showed several active battlefield events and the involvement of Pakistan military personnel in the UN peacekeeping missions. Alpha Bravo Charlie was presented on Pakistan Television Corporation (PTV).

Documentaries 
A BBC documentary series, The Death of Yugoslavia, covers the collapse of Yugoslavia from the roots of the conflict in the 1980s to the subsequent wars and peace accords, and a BBC book was issued with the same title. Other documentaries include Bernard-Henri Lévy's Bosna! about Bosnian resistance against well equipped Serbian troops at the beginning of the war; the Slovenian documentary Tunel upanja (A Tunnel of Hope) about the Sarajevo Tunnel constructed by the besieged citizens of Sarajevo to link Sarajevo with Bosnian government territory; and the British documentary A Cry from the Grave about the Srebrenica massacre. Miracle in Bosnia is a 1995 documentary film shot on the occasion of the third anniversary of the Army of the Republic of Bosnia and Herzegovina; it premiered at the 1995 Cannes Film Festival and won the Special Award. The Bosnian War is a central focus in The Diplomat, a documentary about the career of Richard Holbrooke. Yugoslavia: The Avoidable War (1999) looks at the wider context of the ex-Yugoslavian civil wars.
"Scream for Me Sarajevo" is a 2017 documentary (Directed by Tarik Hodzic) about a concert played by Bruce Dickinson (the lead singer of an English rock band Iron Maiden) and his band Skunkworks, in Sarajevo, in late 1994, during the siege.

Books 
Semezdin Mehmedinović's Sarajevo Blues and Miljenko Jergović's Sarajevo Marlboro are among the best known books written during the war in Bosnia. Zlata's Diary is a published diary kept by a young girl, Zlata Filipović, which chronicles her life in Sarajevo from 1991 to 1993. Because of the diary, she is sometimes referred to as "The Anne Frank of Sarajevo". The Bosnia List by Kenan Trebincevic and Susan Shapiro chronicles the war through the eyes of a Bosnian refugee returning home for the first time after 18 years in New York.

Other works about the war include:
 Bosnia Warriors: Living on the Front Line, by Major Vaughan Kent-Payne is an account of UN operations in Bosnia written by A British Army infantry officer who was based in Vitez, Central Bosnia for seven months in 1993.
 Necessary Targets (by Eve Ensler)
 Winter Warriors – Across Bosnia with the PBI by Les Howard, a factual account by a British Territorial infantryman who volunteered to serve as a UN Peacekeeper in the latter stages of the war, and during the first stages of the NATO led Dayton Peace Accord.
 Pretty Birds, by Scott Simon, depicts a teenage girl in Sarajevo, once a basketball player on her high school team, who becomes a sniper.
 The Cellist of Sarajevo, by Steven Galloway, is a novel following the stories of four people living in Sarajevo during the war.
 Life's Too Short to Forgive, written in 2005 by Len Biser, follows the efforts of three people who unite to assassinate Karadzic to stop Serb atrocities.
 Fools Rush In, written by Bill Carter, tells the story of a man who helped bring U2 to a landmark Sarajevo concert.
 Evil Doesn't Live Here, by Daoud Sarhandi and Alina Boboc, presents 180 posters created by Bosnian artist which plastered walls during the war.
 The Avenger by Frederick Forsyth.
 Hotel Sarajevo by Jack Kersh.
 Top je bio vreo by Vladimir Kecmanović, a story of a Bosnian Serb boy in the part of Sarajevo held by Bosnian Muslim forces during the Siege of Sarajevo.
 I Bog je zaplakao nad Bosnom (And God cried over Bosnia), written by Momir Krsmanović, is a depiction of war that mainly focuses on the crimes committed by Muslim people.
 Safe Area Goražde is a graphic novel by Joe Sacco about the war in eastern Bosnia.
 Dampyr is an Italian comic book, created by Mauro Boselli and Maurizio Colombo and published in Italy by Sergio Bonelli Editore about Harlan Draka, half human, half vampire, who wages war on the multifaceted forces of Evil. The first two episodes are located in Bosnia and Herzegovina (#1 Il figlio del Diavolo) i.e. Sarajevo (#2 La stirpe della note) during the Bosnian War.
 Goodbye Sarajevo – A True Story of Courage, Love and Survival by Atka Reid and Hana Schofield and published in 2011, is the story of two sisters from Sarajevo and their separate experiences of the war.
 Love Thy Neighbor: A Story of War (by Peter Maas), published in 1997 is his account as a reporter at the height of the Bosnian War.
 My War Gone By, I Miss It So by Anthony Loyd is a memoir of Loyd's time spent covering the conflict as a photojournalist and writer.
 The Pepperdogs, a 2004 novel by Bing West, features a United States Marine Corps Force Reconnaissance team caught between sides during the NATO peacekeeping effort.

Music 
U2's "Miss Sarajevo", about the war in Bosnia, features Bono and Luciano Pavarotti. Other songs include "Bosnia" by the Cranberries, "Sarajevo" by UHF, "Pure Massacre" by Silverchair, "Sva bol svijeta" by Fazla, "Nad trupem Jugosławii" by Polish punk rock band KSU and others. The concept album Dead Winter Dead by Savatage tells a story set during the Bosnian War.

The 2003 film Remake, directed by Bosnian director Dino Mustafić and written by Zlatko Topčić, follows father Ahmed and son Tarik Karaga during World War II and the Siege of Sarajevo. It premiered at the 32nd International Film Festival Rotterdam.

Canadian author Steven Galloway’s book “The Cellist of Sarajevo” follows three characters living through the siege and the impacts it has on them.

American rock band Jackopierce wrote the song "Anderson's Luck" from their album Weather based on the siege, describing the life of a couple trying to survive in Sarajevo contrasted with the singer's family, safely watching the events unfold on television.

Video games 
The 2014 video game This War of Mine was inspired by the poor living conditions and wartime atrocities that Bosnian civilians endured during the Siege of Sarajevo where the player controls a group of civilian survivors in a makeshift-damaged house.

See also 
 1991 population census in Bosnia and Herzegovina
 1995 NATO bombing in Bosnia and Herzegovina
 Armed Forces of Bosnia and Herzegovina
 Command responsibility
 High Representative for Bosnia and Herzegovina
 Land mine contamination in Bosnia and Herzegovina
 List of massacres in the Bosnian War
 Role of the media in the Yugoslav wars

Annotations

References

Further reading

Books 
 
 
 
 
 
 
 
 

 
 
 
 
 
 
 Hall, Richard C. ed. War in the Balkans: An Encyclopedic History from the Fall of the Ottoman Empire to the Breakup of Yugoslavia (2014)

Journals 
 Baker, Catherine. "Between the round table and the waiting room: Scholarship on war and peace in Bosnia-Herzegovina and Kosovo after the 'Post-Cold War'." Contemporary European History 28.1 (2019): 107–119. online

Other sources

External links 

 Future of Bosnia and Hercegovina Balkan Insight
 Summary of the ICTY verdicts related to the conflict between Bosnia and Herzegovina and the Federal Republic of Yugoslavia
 Summary of the ICTY verdicts related to the conflict between Bosnia and Herzegovina and Croatia
 
 UN report on prison camps during the war
 Open UN document on Serb atrocities towards non-Serbs
 Roy, Pinaki. "Bosnian War Requiems: Snippets of the Balkan Commemorations". The Atlantic Critical Review Quarterly. 10(4), October–December 2011. pp. 95–115. , ISSN 0972-6373.
 Through My Eyes Website Imperial War Museum – Online Exhibition (Including images, video and interviews with refugees from the war in Bosnia)
Map of Europe showing the Bosnian War (omniatlas.com)
"Quest For War, and One Green Beret's Subsequent Evolution" contains insights on postwar activities by "Joint Commissioned Observers"
  (dedicated to the study, research, and documentation of the destruction and damage of historic heritage during the Balkan Wars of the 1990s. The website contains judicial documents from the International Criminal Tribunal for the former Yugoslavia (ICTY)).
 
 ОТКРИЋЕ: У Босни најмање 104 српске масовне гробнице

 
Wars of independence
Bosnia
Bosnia
Bosnia
1992 in Bosnia and Herzegovina
1993 in Bosnia and Herzegovina
1994 in Bosnia and Herzegovina
1995 in Bosnia and Herzegovina
Bosnia and Herzegovina–Croatia relations
Conflicts in 1992
Conflicts in 1993
Conflicts in 1994
Conflicts in 1995